The demoiselle crane (Grus virgo) is a species of crane found in central Eurosiberia, ranging from the Black Sea to Mongolia and North Eastern China. There is also a small breeding population in Turkey. These cranes are migratory birds. Birds from western Eurasia will spend the winter in Africa while the birds from Asia, Mongolia and China will spend the winter in the Indian subcontinent. The bird is symbolically significant in the culture of India, where it is known as Koonj or Kurjaa.

Description 

It weighs . It is the smallest species of crane. The demoiselle crane is slightly smaller than the common crane but has similar plumage. It has a long white neck stripe and the black on the foreneck extends down over the chest in a plume.

It has a loud trumpeting call, higher-pitched than the common crane. Like other cranes it has a dancing display, more balletic than the common crane, with less leaping.

The demoiselle was so named by Queen Marie Antoinette, for its delicate and maiden-like appearance.

Behaviour and ecology 

The demoiselle crane lives in a variety of different environments, including desert areas and numerous types of grasslands (flooded, mountain, temperate and tropical grassland) which are often within a few hundred metres of streams or lakes. However, when nesting, they prefer patchy areas of vegetation which is tall enough to conceal them and their nests, yet short enough to allow them look out for predators whilst incubating their eggs.

Demoiselle cranes have to take one of the toughest migrations in the world. In late August through September, they gather in flocks of up to 400 individuals and prepare for their flight to their winter range. Along their arduous journey they have to cross the Himalayan mountains to get to their over-wintering grounds in India. Many die from fatigue, hunger and predation from golden eagles. Simpler, lower routes are possible, such as crossing the range via the Khyber Pass. However, their presently preferred route has been hard-wired by countless cycles of migration. At their wintering grounds, demoiselles have been observed flocking with common cranes, their combined totals reaching up to 20,000 individuals. Demoiselles maintain separate social groups within the larger flock. In March and April, they begin their long spring journey back to their northern nesting grounds.

In Khichan, Rajasthan in India, villagers feed the cranes on their migration and these large congregations have become an annual spectacle.

The demoiselle crane is evaluated as Least Concern on the IUCN Red List of Threatened Species. It is one of the species to which the Agreement on the Conservation of African-Eurasian Migratory Waterbirds (AEWA) applies.

In culture

The demoiselle crane is known as the Koonj /Kurjan(कूंज,कुरजां کونج, ਕੂੰਜ) in the languages of North India, and figure prominently in the literature, poetry and idiom of the region. Beautiful women are often compared to the koonj because its long and thin shape is considered graceful. Metaphorical references are also often made to the koonj for people who have ventured far from home or undertaken hazardous journeys.

The name koonj is derived from the Sanskrit word kraunch, which is a cognate Indo-European term for crane itself. In the ancient story of Valmiki, the composer of the Hindu epic Ramayana, it is claimed that his first verse was inspired by the sight of a hunter kill the male of a pair of demoiselle cranes that were courting. Observing the lovelorn female circling and crying in grief, he cursed the hunter in verse. Since tradition held that all poetry prior to this moment had been revealed rather than created by man, this verse concerning the demoiselle cranes is regarded as the first human-composed meter.

The flying formation of the koonj during migrations also inspired infantry formations in ancient India. The Mahabharata epic describes both warring sides adopting the koonj formation on the second day of the Kurukshetra War.

In Pashto this bird is called (Zaanray), like Urdu where koonj is used for beautiful person the Pashto word Zaanray also used for beautiful person.

References

External links 

 eBird Species Factsheet
 Demoiselle crane at Animal Diversity Web
 Demoiselle Crane (Anthropoides virgo) from Cranes of the World (1983) by Paul Johnsgard

demoiselle crane
Birds of Central Asia
Birds of Mongolia
Birds of Central Africa
Birds of East Africa
demoiselle crane
Taxa named by Carl Linnaeus
Taxobox binomials not recognized by IUCN